Robert Greville may refer to:

 Robert Greville, 2nd Baron Brooke (1608–1643), Parliamentary commander
 Robert Greville, 4th Baron Brooke (c.1638–1677), Baron Brooke
 Robert Fulke Greville (1751–1824), British Army officer, courtier and politician
 Robert Kaye Greville (1794–1866), English botanist
 Robert Fulke Greville (landowner) (1800–1867), British politician, soldier and landowner